The GeForce 100 series is a series of Tesla-based graphics processing units developed by Nvidia, first released in March 2009. Its cards are rebrands of GeForce 9 series cards, available only for OEMs. However, the GTS 150 was briefly available to consumers.

Products 
The GeForce 100 Series cards include the G100, GT 120, GT 130, GT 140 and GTS 150. The GT 120 is a based on the 9500 GT with improved thermal designs while the GT 130 is based on the 9600 GSO (which itself was a re-badged 8800 GS). The GT 140 is simply a rebadged 9600 GT. The GTS 150 is an OEM version of the GTS 250 with some slight changes. Despite being based upon previous 9 series cards, the G 100, GT 120, and GT 130 utilize entirely different PCB's and slightly different clock speeds.

Chipset table

Discontinued support 

NVIDIA has ceased driver support for GeForce 100 series on April 1, 2016.

 Windows XP 32-bit & Media Center Edition: version 340.52 released on July 29, 2014; Download
 Windows XP 64-bit: version 340.52 released on July 29, 2014; Download
 Windows Vista, 7, 8, 8.1 32-bit: version 342.01 (WHQL) released on December 14, 2016; Download
 Windows Vista, 7, 8, 8.1 64-bit: version 342.01 (WHQL) released on December 14, 2016; Download
 Windows 10, 32-bit: version 342.01 (WHQL) released on December 14, 2016; Download
 Windows 10, 64-bit: version 342.01 (WHQL) released on December 14, 2016; Download

See also
 GeForce 8 Series
 GeForce 9 Series
 GeForce 200 Series
 GeForce 300 Series
 GeForce 400 Series
 GeForce 500 Series
 GeForce 600 Series
 Nvidia Quadro
 Nvidia Tesla

References

External links

Computer-related introductions in 2009
100 series
Graphics cards